Emily Kinkead is an American politician. She is a Democrat in the Pennsylvania House of Representatives. In 2020, Kinkead was elected to represent District 20, which encompasses several communities in Pittsburgh and Allegheny County.

Education
In 2009, Kinkead earned a Bachelor of Science degree in Biology and a Bachelor of Arts degree in Political Science from Bloomsburg University of Pennsylvania. In 2016, she earned her Juris Doctor degree from the University of Pittsburgh School of Law.

Background
Kinkead is a private-practice lawyer from the Brighton Heights neighborhood of Pittsburgh. Previously, Kinkead has worked in Washington D.C. for Common Cause on government ethics reform, for the National Institutes of Health and as a Judicial Law Clerk for Allegheny County Commonwealth Court Judge, Michael Wojcik.

Political career
In 2019, Kinkead and Emily Marburger, mayor of Bellevue, Pennsylvania, entered the Democratic primary against Adam Ravenstahl, the incumbent in their district. In November 2019, Marburger dropped out of the race. Kinkead defeated Ravenstahl in the primary on June 2, 2020.

She was unopposed in the general election on November 3, 2020, and took office on December 1, 2020.

Committee assignments 

 Agriculture & Rural Affairs
 Appropriations
 Committee On Committees
 Human Services
 Judiciary

References

External links
Official Pennsylvania House profile

Democratic Party members of the Pennsylvania House of Representatives
Women state legislators in Pennsylvania
Politicians from Pittsburgh
Living people
Year of birth missing (living people)
21st-century American women
Bloomsburg University of Pennsylvania alumni
University of Pittsburgh School of Law alumni
1987 births
Place of birth missing (living people)